Corbin Watson (born January 6, 1987) is a Canadian Paralympic ice sledge hockey goalkeeper whose team won 3–0 against Norway and received bronze medal at the 2014 Winter Paralympics. Previously, he participated at the 2013 IPC World Sledge Hockey Championships where he and his team won gold medals. An amputee, he lost his lower right leg following a car crash in 2006. Following the accident he joined Canadian sledge hockey team called Windsor Ice Bullets 2 years later in Windsor, Ontario where he was inspired by Ray Grassi, his teammate. In 2009 he won a gold medal at the Défi sportif tournament.

Personal life
He is a son of Alex and Joan Watson, and has a brother and a sister. In June 2013 he was awarded with the key to Kingsville for his performance at the 2013 IPC World Sledge Hockey Championship. He is inspired by Canadian hockey players such as Martin Brodeur and Miikka Kiprusoff.

References

External links 
 
 

1987 births
Living people
Canadian amputees
Canadian sledge hockey players
Paralympic sledge hockey players of Canada
Paralympic silver medalists for Canada
Paralympic bronze medalists for Canada
Ice sledge hockey players at the 2014 Winter Paralympics
Para ice hockey players at the 2018 Winter Paralympics
Medalists at the 2014 Winter Paralympics
Medalists at the 2018 Winter Paralympics
Paralympic medalists in sledge hockey